The following are the national records in athletics in American Samoa by American Samoa's national athletics federation: American Samoa Track & Field Association (ASTFA).

Outdoor

Key to tables:

h = hand timing

# = not officially ratified by federation

A = affected by altitude

NWI = no wind measurement

Men

Women

‡: Another source states : no height
†: 36.47 m in Claremont, California, United States, by another source

Indoor

Men

Women

Notes

References

External links
 ASTFA web site

American Samoa
Records
Athletics